Nadimpalli is a remote rural village in Puthalapattu mandal of Chittoor district in Andhra Pradesh in India.

Government and politics 
Pantapalle gram panchayat is the local self-government of the village. It is divided into wards and each ward is represented by a ward member. As per the recent election results, Smt. Neeraja Gadde is the current sarpanch of the panchayat and Vinod Kumar J is the upa-sarpanch of the panchayat.

Agriculture 
The major crops in this village are Paddy, Sugarcane, Groundnuts, Mango etc. The majority of the land is utilized for agriculture in this village.

Education 
As per the school information report for the academic year 2020–21, the village has one Mandal Parishad school.

Temples 
There are multiple temples in the Nadimpalli village which are listed below.

 Sri Rama Temple
 Virabhadra Swamy Temple

Festivals 
People in this village celebrate the below festivals.

 Makara Sankranthi (aka Pongal) - 3/4 Days
 Ugadi - 1 Day
 Sri Rama Navami - 1/2 Days
 Varalakshmi Vratham - 1 Day
 Vinayaka Chavithi (aka Ganesh Chaturthi) - 3 Days
 Vijaya Dasami (aka Dussehra) - 1 Day
 Deepavali (aka Diwali) - 2 Days
 Karthika Pournami - 1 Day

Tourism Places 

 Kalikiri Konda
 Puligundu, Penumur
 Kanipakam

Transportation 
There is only road convey available to reach this village, however other designates of convey is available to nearby locations.

Air 
The nearest airport is Tirupati Airport, from there trains (Indian Railways) & buses (APSRTC) are available to Puthalapattu. Plenty of shared auto rickshaw's are available from Puthalapattu (ask for Polavaram Auto stand) to Nadimpalli with a fare of Rs.15 or Rs.20 per head.

Train 
Trains are available from Tirupati, Pakala, Katpadi, Vellore, Chittoor, Renigunta to Puthalapattu. Alternatively, one can reach any of the mentioned railway stations and took a bus to Puthalapattu or Chittoor. Puthalapattu railway station is 2 kilometres away from the actual town and located near Oddepalli. Few auto rickshaw's will be available from Railway station to Puthalapattu town. One can walk towards Bangalore-Tirupati highway about 850 metres and take an auto rickshaw to Puthalapattu town. Plenty of shared auto rickshaw's are available from Puthalapattu (ask for Polavaram Auto stand) to Nadimpalli with a fare of Rs.15 or Rs.20 per head.

Road 
Plenty of buses available from Chittoor, Pileru, Pakala, Kanipakam, Tirupati etc., to Puthalapattu which are operated by APSRTC and other public/private travels. Plenty of shared auto rickshaw's are available from Puthalapattu (ask for Polavaram Auto stand) to Nadimpalli with a fare of Rs.15 or Rs.20 per head. Alternatively, one can reach Nadimpalli in their personal vehicles like car, bike etc.,

References 

Villages in Chittoor district